Heersberg is a mountain of Baden-Württemberg, Germany. It is located in Zollernalbkreis.

Mountains and hills of the Swabian Jura
Zollernalbkreis